Liisi is a Finnish and Estonian female given name. Its nameday is on the 19 November. It originated as a variation of the name Lisa.

Notable people
Some notable people who have this name include:
Liisi Koikson (born 1983), Estonian singer 
Liisi Ojamaa (1972–2019), Estonian poet, translator, literary critic and editor
Liisi Oterma (1915–2001), Finnish astronomer
Liisi Rist (born 1991), Estonian cyclist

See also
Lisa (given name)

Finnish feminine given names
Estonian feminine given names